Dorytomus is a genus of weevils belonging the family Curculionidae and subfamily Curculioninae. It was first described by the German entomologist, Ernst Friedrich Germar in 1817.

See also
 List of Dorytomus species

References

External links
 Plant Parasites of Europe 
 
 

Curculionidae
Beetles described in 1817
Beetles of Europe
Taxa named by Ernst Friedrich Germar